The 1949 European Wrestling Championships were held in Istanbul, Turkey.

Medal table

Medal summary

Men's freestyle

References

External links
FILA Database

Wrestling
International sports competitions in Helsinki
1949 in Turkish sport
1949 in European sport
Sports competitions in Istanbul